Morten "Diesel" Dahl (born 19 June 1959 in Trondheim, Norway) is the drummer and co-founder of the Norwegian hard rock band TNT.

He started playing the drums at the age of 15, and played in bands like Burn, Edge and Hotlips before he formed TNT together with vocalist Dag Ingebrigtsen in 1982. Dahl played on the first three TNT albums and co-wrote their biggest hit, "10,000 Lovers (In One)", before he parted ways with the band in the fall of 1987. The following year he formed the band TinDrum, who got a national number 1 hit with "Drums of War".

In the early 1990s Dahl joined the local Hells Angels motorcycle club in Trondheim and became their spokesperson. Throughout the 1990s he played in various bands, such as Diesel Dahl & Friends and Diezel, before he officially reunited with TNT in 2000. He left Hells Angels in 2005.

His daughter Carina Dahl is a singer and glamour model.

Discography

TNT
 TNT (1982)
 Knights of the New Thunder (1984)
 Tell No Tales (1987)
 Give me a Sign EP (2003)
 My Religion (2004)
 All the Way to the Sun (2005)
 Live in Madrid (2006)
 The New Territory (2007)
 Atlantis (2008)
 A Farewell to Arms (2010)
 XIII (2018)

TinDrum
 Drums of War (1988)
 How About This?! (1989)
 Cool, Calm & Collected (1990)

Diezel
 Willpower (1995)

Diesel Dahl & Friends 
 reCYCLEd (1997)
 Happy Birthday Harley Davidson: Tribute To A Legend (2003)

References

Sources
http://www.dieseldahl.com/

20th-century Norwegian drummers
21st-century Norwegian drummers
Norwegian rock drummers
Male drummers
TNT (Norwegian band) members
Living people
1959 births
People from Trondheim
20th-century drummers
20th-century Norwegian male musicians
21st-century Norwegian male musicians